Rohingya (Hanifi Rohingya: ,), is an Indo-Aryan language spoken by the Rohingya people of Rakhine State, Myanmar. It is an Eastern Indo-Aryan language belonging to the Bengali–Assamese branch, and is closely related to the Chittagonian language spoken in neighbouring Bangladesh. The Rohingya and Chittagonian languages have a high degree of mutual intelligibility.

Phonology

Consonants 

Rohingya has primarily the following 25 native consonant phonemes. There are some other consonant phonemes which are from foreign languages such as Arabic, Bengali, Burmese and Urdu.

 A dental fricative [θ] may also be heard in words of Arabic origin.
 [v] is only used in words of foreign origin.
 /n/ is heard as [ɳ] when preceding /ʈ, ɖ/.
Allophones of /k, ɡ/ can be heard as [c, ɟ].

Vowels 

 Short allophones of /e, a/ are heard as [ɛ, æ], [ʌ, ə]. Allophones of /i, u/ are heard as [ɪ, ʊ].

There are six vowels and several diphthongs in the Rohingya language.  They contrast between "open-o" and "closed-o" by using the different spellings / and / respectively.

Tones 

Accented vowels, marked with an acute accent, represent stressed (or "hard" vowels), and repeating a vowel lengthens it.

Grammar

Definite articles 
1. If a noun ends with a vowel then the article is either an or wa if singular, or un or in if plural or uncountable.Usually wa is used for round-fatty objects, and an for flat-thin objects.

2. If a noun ends with a consonant then the article is the end-consonant plus án or wá for singular or ún or ín for plural.

3. If a noun ends with r, then the article is g plus án or wá for singular or ún or ín for plural.
gún is used for human and gín for non-human.

Indefinite articles 
Indefinite articles can be used either before or after the noun. Uggwá usually is used for roll/round/fatty shaped objects and ekkán is for thin/flat shaped objects.

Word order 
Rohingya word order-1 is Subject–Object–Verb.

Rohingya word order-2 is Subject–Time-Place-Object–Verb.

Rohingya word order-3 is Subject–Time-[adjective]-Place-Object–[adverb]-Verb.

Rohingya word order-4 is Subject–Time-[adjective]-Place-Object–[adverb]-Verb_1-Verb_2.

More on Time extension:
 Aijja Januari 24 tarík ót, cón 2017 beínna 4 gwá báze 15 miníth 5 sekén ót.Today January dated 24, year 2017 in the morning at 4 o'clock 15 minutes 5 second.
 Hailla Januari 30 tarík ót, cón 2017 ázinna 5 swá báze 25 minith 7 sekén ót.Tomorrow January dated 30, year 2017 in the evening at 5 o'clock 25 minutes 7 second.
 Goto hailla Oktubor 10 tarík ót, cón 2018 rait or 10 cwá báze 35 miníth 50 sekén ot.Yesterday October dated 10, year 2018 in the night at 10 o'clock 35 minutes 50 second.

Tenses 
Rohingya distinguishes 3 tenses and 4 aspects, as shown in the examples below. In these tenses, the helping verb félai shows perfect action (comparable to English "has/have") and félaat shows perfect continuous action (compare English "has/have been"). The helping verb táki and táikki are comparable to English "be" and "been".

Verb-form-suffix (basic and/or helping verb) indicate both person and tense. The suffixes ~ir, ~yi, ~lám, ~youm are used for the first person, the suffixes ~or, ~yó, ~lá, ~bá for the 2nd person, and the suffixes ~ar, ~ye, ~l, ~bou for the 3rd person.

Similarly ~ir, ~or, ~ar indicate present continuous tense, ~yi, ~yó, ~ye present perfect tense, ~lám, ~lá, ~l  past tense, and ~youm, ~bá, ~bou future tense.

Pronouns 

Gender: m=male, f=female, n=neuter., *=the person or object is near., **=the person or object is far.

Interrogative 
The interrogative is indicated by né at the end of the sentence.

Itattú gór ekkán asé né? [Does he have a house?]
Itattú gór ekkán asé. [He has a house.]
Ibá za né? [Does she go?]
Ibá za. [She goes.]
Itará giyé né? [Did they go?]
Itará giyé. [They went.]

Inflection for person 
Rohingya verbs indicate person by suffixes.

Present Tense
lek   = write (command to you sg.)
lekí  = I/we write.
lekó  = write (command to you pl.)
lekós = You write (sg./pl.).
leké  = He/she/they write(s).

Present Continuous Tense
lekír = I/we am/are writing.
lekór = You (sg./pl.) are writing.
lekér = He/she/they is/are writing.

Present Perfect Tense
lekífélaiyi  = I/we have written.
lekífélaiyo  = You (sg./pl.) have written.
lekífélaiyós = You (sg.) have written. (used to very closed people)
lekífélaiye  = He/she/they has/have written.

Future Tense
lekíyóum  = I/we will write.
lekíbá    = You (sg./pl.) will write.
lekíbi    = You (sg.) will write. (used to very closed people)
lekíbóu   = He/she/they will write.

Past Tense (Immediate/near past)
leikkí  = I/we wrote.
leikkó  = You (sg./pl.) wrote.
leikkós = You (sg.) wrote. (used to very closed people)
leikké  = He/she/they wrote.

Past Tense (Remote past)
leikkílám = I/we wrote long ago.
leikkílá  = You (sg./pl.) wrote long ago.
leikkílí  = You (sg.) wrote long ago. (used to very closed people)
leikkíl   = He/she/they wrote long ago.

Past Tense (If possibility)
lekítám = I/we would have written.
lekítá  = You (sg./pl.) would have written.
lekítí  = You (sg.) would have written. (used to very closed people)
lekítóu = He/she/they would have written.

Forming Noun, Doer, Tool, Action
lekóon = act of writing.
        e.g. Debalor uore lekóon gom noó. Writing on wall is not good.
lekóya = writer.
        e.g. Itaráttú lekóya bicí. They-have many writers.
lekóni = thing with which you write.
        e.g. Añártú honó lekóni nái. I-have no any writing-thing (i.e. pen, pencil)
lekát  = in the action of writing.
        e.g. Tui lekát asós. You are busy-in-writing.

Case 
Examples of the case inflection are given below, using the singular forms of the Rohingya term for "hóliba (tailor)" which belongs to Rohingya's first declension class.
 hólibaye (nominative) "[the] hóliba" [as a subject] (e.g. hólibaye tíai táikke éçe – the tailor is standing there)
 hólibar (genitive) "[the] hóliba's / [of the] hóliba" (e.g. hólibar nam Ahmed – the tailor's name is Ahmed)
 hóliballa (dative) "[to/for the] hóliba" [as an indirect object] (e.g. hóliballa hádiya ekkán diyí – I gave a present for the tailor)
 hólibare (accusative) "[the] hóliba" [as a direct object] (e.g. Aññí hólibare deikkí – I saw the tailor)
 hólibaloi (ablative) "[by/with/from/in the] hóliba" [in various uses] (e.g. Aññí hólibaloi duan ot giyí – I went to the shop with the tailor).'
 óu hóliba / hóliba ya (vocative) "[you] the hóliba" [addressing the object] (e.g. "cúkuria tuáñre, óu hóliba (sáb)" – thank you, tailor).

Morphology 
Seventy or more different forms are available in Rohingya. A hyphen (-) between letters is to be removed, it is used for initial understanding only — how the word is formed.

Command
 lek =write (sg.)         Tui yián ehón lek.                         You write this right now.
 lek-ó =write (pl.) Tuñí yián ehón lekó.                 You write this right now.
 lek-á =cause to write Tui/Tuñí John ór áta leká/lekó.         You ask John to write.
 lek-í-de =help to write Tui/Tuñí ibáre lekíde/lekído.         You help John in writing.

Present
 lek-í =write (I)         Aññí hámicá gór ot lekí.                 I always write at home.
 lek-ó =write (II) Tuñí hámicá gór ot lekó.                 You always write at home.
 lek-ó-s =write (IIa) Tui hámicá gór ot lekós.                 You always write at home.
 lek-é =write (III) Tará hámicá gór ot leké.                 They always write at home.

Continuous
 lek-í-r =writing (I) Aññí ciñçí ekkán lekír.                 I am writing a letter now.
 lek-ó-or =writing (II) Tuñí/Tui ciñçí ekkán lekóor.         You are writing a letter now.
 lek-é-r =writing (III)   Tará ciñçí ekkán lekér.                  They are writing a letter now.

Perfect
 lek-í-féla-iyi =have written (I)         Aññí ciñçí lekífélaiyi.  I have written a letter.
 lek-í-féla-iyo =have written (II) Tuñí ciñçí lekífélaiyo. You have written a letter.
 lek-í-féla-iyo-s =have written (IIa) Tui ciñçí lekífélaiyos. You have written a letter.
 lek-í-féla-iye =has/have written (III) Tará ciñçí lekífélaiye.  They have written a letter.

Past
 leik-kí =wrote (I) Aññí ciñçí ekkán leikkí.                 I wrote a letter.
 leik-kó =wrote (II) Tuñí ciñçí ekkán leikkó.                 You wrote a letter.
 leik-kó-s =wrote (IIa) Tui ciñçí ekkán leikkós.                 You wrote a letter.
 leik-ké =wrote (III) Tará ciñçí ekkán leikké.                 They wrote a letter.

Future
 lek-í-youm =will write (I) Aññí ciñçí ekkán lekíyoum.         I will write a letter.
 lek-í-ba =will write (II) Tuñí ciñçí ekkán lekíba.         You will write a letter.
 lek-í-bi =will write (IIa) Tui ciñçí ekkán lekkíbi.         You will write a letter.
 lek-í-bou =will write (III) Tará ciñçí ekkán lekíbou.         They will write a letter.

Alternative
 leik-kyóum =will write (I) Aññí ciñçí ekkán leikkyóum.         I will write a letter.
 leik-bá =will write (II)         Tuñí ciñçí ekkán leikbá.         You will write a letter.
 leik-bí =will write (IIa) Tui ciñçí ekkán leikbí.         You will write a letter.
 leik-bóu =will write (III) Tará ciñçí ekkán leikbóu.         They will write a letter.

Passive
 lek-á-giye =(passive I, II, III) Ciñçí ekkán lekágiyé.         A letter is/was written.

Possibility
 lek-á-za =being writable         Ciñçí yián leká za.         This letter is writable.
 lek-á-za-ibou =being writable in future  This letter will be writable.
 lek-á-di-ya-za =can be made writable Ciñçí yián lekádiyaza. This letter can be made writable.

Noun
 lek-á =writing                  Leká yián bicí cúndor.         This writing is very beautiful.
 lek-ó-on =act of writing Email beggún óttu lekóon saá. All should write emails.
 lek-ó-ya =person who writes Ahmed bála lekóya.                 Ahmed is a good writer.
 lek-ó-ni =thing used to write Añártu honó lekóni ciz nái.         I do not have anything to write with.
 lek-á-ni =tool used to write Añártu honó lekáni boudh nái. I do not have any writing board.
 lek-á-lekí =activities to write Tuáñrár bútore lekáleki tákoon saá. There should be writing between you.

Adjective
 lek-é-de =thing used for writing Añártu honó lekéde ciz nái.   I do not have any writable thing.
 leik-kyá =of written                 Kitab ibá fura leikká.         This book is fully written.
 leik-kyé-dé=of that written         Añártu honó leikkyéde juab nái. I do not have any written answer.

Adverb
 lek-í lek-í =by writing & writing/while writing   Ite gór ottu lekí lekí aiyér. He is coming from home while writing.

Immediate present
 lek-í-lam =acted to write (I) Aññí habos sán lekílam.                 I write the letter.
 lek-í-la =acted to write (II) Tuñí habos sán lekíla.             You write the letter.
 lek-í-li =acted to write (II) Tui habos sán lekíli.             You write the letter.
 lek-í-lou =acted to write (III) Tará habos sán lekílou.                 They write the letter.

Alternative
 leik-lám =acted to write (I) Aññí habos sán lekílam.                 I write the letter.
 leik-lá =acted to write (II) Tuñí habos sán lekíla.                 You write the letter.
 leik-lí =acted to write (II) Tui habos sán lekíli.                 You write the letter.
 leik-lou =acted to write (III) Tará habos sán lekílou.          They write the letter.

Long past
 leik-kí-lam =had written (I) Aññí habos sán leikkílam.         I had written this paper long ago.
 leik-kí-la =had written (II) Tuñí habos sán leikkíla.         You had written this paper long ago.
 leik-kí-li =had written (II) Tui habos sán leikkíli.                 You had written this paper long ago.
 leik-kí-l =had written (III) Tará habos sán leikkíl.                 They had written this paper long ago.

Remote future
 lek-í-youm éri =will write later (I) Aññí habos sán lekíyoum éri.  I will write the paper sometime later.
 lek-í-ba ri =will write later (II) Tuñí habos sán lekíba ri.  You will write the paper sometime later.
 lek-í-bi ri =will write later (IIa) Tui habos sán lekíbi ri.  You write the paper sometime later.
 lek-í-bou ri =will write later (III) Tará habos sán lekíbou ri.  They will write the paper sometime later.

Conditional
 lek-í-tam =would have written (I) Aññí email lán lekítam.         I would have written the email.
 lek-í-ta =would have written (II) Tuñí email lán lekíta i.         You would have written the email.
 lek-í-ti =would have written (IIa) Tui email lán lekíti.         You would have written the email.
 lek-í-tou =would have written (III) Tará email lán lekítou.         They would have written the email.

Alternative
 leik-tám =would have written (I)         Aññí email lán leiktám.         I would have written the email.
 leik-tá =would have written (II)         Tuñí email lán leiktá.              You would have written the email.
 leik-tí =would have written (IIa) Tui email lán leiktí.          You would have written the email.
 leik-tóu =would have written (III) Tará email lán leiktóu.         They would have written the email.

Request/allow
 lek-ó-na =please write                 Meérbanigorí lekóna.         Please write the letter.
 lek-ó-goi =allowed to write             Tuñí lekó gói.                                 Let you write.

Alternative
 lek-se-ná =please write                 Meérbanigorí leksená.         Please write the letter.
 lek-gói =allowed to write          Tui lek gói.                 Let you write.

If
 lek-í-le =if (I/II/III) person write Tuñí lekíle gom óibou.         It will be good if you write.

Writing systems

Rohingya Hanifi script 
The Hanifi Rohingya script is a unified script for the Rohingya language. Rohingya was first written in the 19th century with a version of the Perso-Arabic script. In 1975, an orthographic Arabic script was developed, based on the Urdu alphabet.

In the 1980s, (Maolana) Mohammad Hanif and his colleagues created the suitable phonetic script based on Arabic letters; it has been compared to the N’ko script. The script also includes a set of decimal numbers.

A virtual keyboard was developed by Google for the Rohingya language in 2019 and allows users to type directly in Rohingya script. The Rohingya Unicode keyboard layout can be found here.

Characters

Arabic script 
The first Rohingya language texts, written in Arabic script, are claimed to be more than 200 years old, though there is no concrete evidence about it. While Arakan was under British rule (1826–1948), the Rohingya people used mainly English and Urdu for written communication. Since independence in 1948, Burmese has been used in all official communications. Since the early 1960s, Rohingya scholars have started to realise the need for a writing system suited to their own language.

In 1975, a writing system was developed using Arabic letters; other scholars adopted Urdu script to remedy some deficiencies of the Arabic. Neither proved satisfactory, however, and most Rohingyas found it difficult to read the language in either version.

Following these attempts, (Maolana) Mohammad Hanif achieved a dedicated right-to-left alphabet for the Rohingya language in 1983. Named after its author, the Hanifi alphabet is a modified form of the Arabic alphabet, with additional borrowings from Latin and Burmese alphabets.

At present, a Rohingya Unicode font is available. It is based on Arabic letters (since those are far more understood by the people) with additional tone signs. Tests that have been conducted suggest that this script can be learned in a matter of hours if the reader has learned Arabic in a madrassa.

The Rohingya Fonna Unicode keyboard layout as well as a free font can be found here.

Latin Rohingya script 
In 1999 E.M. Siddique Basu was able to simplify the Rohingya writing using Latin letters. It is an intuitive writing system which can be learnt easily and is known as Rohingyalish or Rohingya Fonna that uses only 26 Roman letters, five accented vowels, and two additional Latin characters for retroflex and nasal sounds.

Q, V, and X are used only for loan-words.

The character set table of the Rohingya writing system uses the Latin letters shown above (ç and ñ with green background). The vowels are written both unaccented (aeiou) and accented (áéíóú). The use of c, ç and ñ is adapted to the language; c represents  (English sh), ç is the retroflex r, and ñ indicates a nasalised vowel (e.g., fañs  'five'). Crucially, these can all be accessed from an English keyboard, for example by using the English (US) International keyboard.

Names and pronunciation of letters
The names of the letters of the Latin Rohingya alphabet are similar to the names of the letters of the English alphabet.

Long vowels in Rohingyalish are spelled with double vowels: for example, a long  is spelled as "oo", while a long  is spelled as "oou".

Sample text 
The following is a sample text in Rohingya of Article 1 of the Universal Declaration of Human Rights with English, contrasted with versions of the text in Bengali and Assamese.

Rohingya in Rohingya Latin alphabet
Manúic beggún azad hísafe, ar izzot arde hók ókkol ót, fúainna hísafe foida óiye. Fottí insán óttu honó forók sára elan ot aséde tamám hók ókkol arde azadi ókkol loi fáaida goróon ór hók asé. Ar, taráre dil arde demak diyé. Ótolla, taráttu ekzon loi arekzon bái hísafe maamela goróon saá.

Rohingya in Hanafi Script
.
.
.
.

English original: "All human beings are born free and equal in dignity and rights. They are endowed with reason and conscience and should act towards one another in a spirit of brotherhood."

Bengali Latin script
Shômosto manush shadhinbhabe shôman môrjada ebong odhikar niye jônmogrohon kôre. Tãder bibek ebong buddhi achhe; shutorang shôkoleri êke ôporer proti bhratrittoshulobh mônobhab niye achôron kôra uchit.

Assamese in Latin script
Xôkôlû manuhê sadhinbhawê xôman môrzôda aru ôdhikar lôi zônmôgrôhôn kôrê. Xihôtôr bibêk aru buddhi asê aru xihôtê pôrôspôr bhratrittôrê asôrôn kôribô lagê.

References

External links 

 Rohingya Language Academy website
 Rohingya Language Foundation website
 English–Rohingya Dictionary
 Rohingya font download

Eastern Indo-Aryan languages
Languages of Myanmar

Subject–object–verb languages
Arabic alphabets for South Asian languages
Bengali dialects
Rohingya language